Chlorogomphus iriomotensis is a species of dragonfly in the family Chlorogomphidae. It is endemic to Japan.

References

Insects of Japan
Chlorogomphidae
Insects described in 1972
Taxonomy articles created by Polbot